Bronson Price, known professionally as Melodownz, is a New Zealand MC, rapper and urban poet from Avondale, Auckland. Debuting in 2013, Melodownz has released solo projects including Beginners Luck (2014), Avontales (2017) and Melo & Blues (2018), as well as collaborative extended plays with Angelo King, IllBaz and Raiza Biza.

Biography

Melodownz was raised in Avondale by his Samoan Catholic grandmother, English grandfather and his mother. He has Samoan, Pākehā and Ngāpuhi heritage. Melodownz debuted as a musician in 2013, composing reggae/hip-hop songs inspired by his upbringing. He released his debut album Beginners Luck in 2014, and followed this with an extended play as half of the Young Gifted and Broke hip-hop duo Third3ye alongside Angelo King, 3P (2016).

In 2017, Melodownz released the hip hop EP Avontales, and in 2018 released two projects: a collaboration EP High Beams with IllBaz and Raiza Biza, featuring musicians including Teeks and Che Fu, and the double-EP Melo & Blues. Melodownz won the award for Most Promising Artist at the 2019 Pacific Music Awards.

In 2020, Melodownz began Kava Corner, a YouTube interview series where Melodownz interviews New Zealand media personalities and celebrities such as broadcaster John Campbell, boxer Joseph Parker and musician Benee while sharing kava. He was nominated for the Breakthrough Artist of the Year award at the 2020 Aotearoa Music Awards.

Discography

Studio albums

Extended plays

Singles

As lead artist

As featured artist

Promotional singles

Guest appearances

References

21st-century New Zealand musicians
Living people
Māori-language singers
Ngāpuhi people
New Zealand people of Samoan descent
New Zealand rappers
New Zealand record producers
People from Auckland
Year of birth missing (living people)